is a former Japanese football player. He played for Japan national team.

Club career
Imamura was born in Koka on April 27, 1949. After graduating from high school, he joined Yanmar Diesel in 1968. He played as winger with Kunishige Kamamoto and assisted with many of his goals. The club won the league championship in 1971, 1974, 1975, and 1980. He retired in 1983. He played 230 games and scored 60 goals in the league.

National team career
On August 8, 1976, Imamura debuted for Japan national team against India. He played 4 games for Japan in 1976.

National team statistics

References

External links
 
 Japan National Football Team Database

1949 births
Living people
Association football people from Shiga Prefecture
Japanese footballers
Japan international footballers
Japan Soccer League players
Cerezo Osaka players
Association football forwards